Sweetshouse is a hamlet in Cornwall, England, United Kingdom. It is about one mile south of Lanhydrock.

References

Hamlets in Cornwall